The men's mass start competition of the Vancouver 2010 Olympics was held at Whistler Olympic Park in Whistler, British Columbia on February 21, 2010. On October 26, 2020, it was announced that Evgeny Ustyugov was charged by the Biathlon Integrity Unit for haemoglobin doping and could lose his 2010 results.

Results

References

External links 
 2010 Winter Olympics results: Men's 15 km Mass Start, from Vancouver 2010 official website; retrieved 2010-02-20.

Mass start